Milorad Trbić (born 22 February 1958) is a Bosnian Serb who served as an Assistant Commander for Security with the Zvornik Brigade of the Army of Republika Srpska. He was indicted for genocide by the International Criminal Tribunal for the former Yugoslavia (ICTY), arrested, and transferred to Sarajevo to stand genocide trial in front of the Court of Bosnia and Herzegovina.

He was found guilty on one count of genocide and sentenced to 30 years in prison.

See also
 Bosnian Genocide

References

External links
 Milorad Trbic  indictment by the Hague Tribunal

Living people
1958 births
Army of Republika Srpska soldiers
People convicted by the International Criminal Tribunal for the former Yugoslavia
Serbs of Bosnia and Herzegovina convicted of genocide
Bosnian genocide perpetrators
People from Maglaj